Illinois Route 2 (IL 2) is a north–south state highway in northern Illinois. It currently starts at Illinois Route 40 in Sterling and ends at the Wisconsin state line in South Beloit, very near the intersection with U.S. Route 51, Illinois Route 75 and Illinois Route 251.

Route description 
Illinois 2 used to follow the Rock River from Rock Island to South Beloit. It was used in the 19th century as a primary trading route from Rockford to Rock Island, The Rock River was not used as a trading route for boats as it is only navigable west of Rock Falls.

Illinois 2 has since been superseded by Interstate 39 and Interstate 88 for most ground transportation, but the original route remains.

In Sterling, IL 2 begins as a one-way pair. Near the Sinnissippi Mounds, the two one-way roads merge into a two-way road. From Sterling to Dixon, IL 2 largely follows a portion of Lincoln Highway but with one exception. Lincoln Highway branches off northeast to Palmyra and then back southeast to IL 2 just northwest of Dixon. Just north of Dixon, both routes run concurrently with US 52 and IL 26. They then cross the Rock River to get to downtown. In downtown, IL 2 branches off northeast from the other two routes.

At Grand Detour, IL 2 transitions from following the south/east bank of Rock River to the north/west bank via a bridge. Further north, it passes through Castle Rock State Park, IL 64 at the Ogle County Courthouse in Oregon, and IL 72 in Byron (runs concurrently with IL 2). North of the Chicago Rockford International Airport, IL 2 turns north. At this point, it largely parallels IL 251 for the rest of the route which is east of the river. It then meets US 20 at a diamond interchange (formerly a cloverleaf interchange).

As IL 2 gets closer to downtown Rockford, another split occurs. Northbound traffic continues on Main Street, then east on Chestnut Street (US 20 Business), then north on Wyman Street, then west on Park Avenue near the site of Beattie Park Mound Group, and then back north on Main Street before merging. Southbound traffic has to turn west onto John Street, then south on Church Street, and then east on Cedar Street before merging.

In Rockton, IL 2 transitions from the west side of the river to the east side again. Further north, IL 75 runs concurrently with IL 2 from Rockton to South Beloit. Before IL 2 transitions into WIS 213, IL 75 branches out to the east. Then, IL 2 crosses a railroad crossing and then Turtle Creek. It continues further until it reaches the Wisconsin state line.

History 

SBI Route 2 originally ran from South Beloit to Cairo. It followed a part of current IL 2 from South Beloit to Dixon. It then followed south on (roughly) present-day US 52, IL 251, and US 51. In 1935, US 51 supplanted IL 2 south of Mendota. With the appearance of US 52 in 1936, IL 2 was removed south of Dixon. Then, in 1938, IL 2 was briefly extended to Muscatine, Iowa, replacing IL 84 and IL 86 in the process. It soon got cut back to Rock Island in 1939 after IL 92 was extended to Muscatine. By the late 1970s, IL 2 was removed west of Sterling as Illinois Route 5 (now I-88 east of I-80) was extended to Rock Island.

IL 2, from Sterling to the I-80/I-88 interchange; continued west on W 4th st to Lincoln Hwy where it meets up with State Route 30.  The route then split from Route 30 and ran on today's road known as Moline Road which passes through Lyndon, Erie, and ends in Hillsdale.  From there the road turns into "RTE 2 and 92" before ending at I-88.  This route is visible on the 1948 Illinois Road Map: http://www.idaillinois.org/digital/collection/isl9/id/64/rec/23

IL 2 was designated a Blue Star Memorial Highway on November 4, 1970. The sign can be found in a wayside just west of the Winnebago County line in Ogle County along the Rock River.

Major intersections

References

External links

002
Monuments and memorials in Illinois
Transportation in Whiteside County, Illinois
Transportation in Lee County, Illinois
Transportation in Ogle County, Illinois
Transportation in Winnebago County, Illinois
U.S. Route 51
U.S. Route 52